Uganda is competing at the 2022 World Athletics Championships in Eugene, United States, being held from 15 to 24 July 2022.

Medallists

Results
Uganda has entered 17 athletes.

Men 
Track and road events

Women 
Track and road events

References

External links
Oregon22｜WCH 22｜World Athletics

Nations at the 2022 World Athletics Championships
World Championships in Athletics
Uganda at the World Championships in Athletics